Scopula improba is a moth of the family Geometridae. It was described by Warren in 1899. It is found in the Republic of the Congo and  Uganda.

References

Moths of Africa
Insects of Uganda
Moths described in 1899
Endemic fauna of Uganda
improba
Taxa named by William Warren (entomologist)